David Tao, born Tao Xuzhong (born 11 July 1969), is a Taiwanese Golden Melody Award-winning singer-songwriter. He is well known for creating a crossover genre of R&B and hard rock tunes which has now become his signature style and for having popularized R&B in the Mandopop industry.

Biography
Tao was born on July 11, 1969 in Hong Kong to parents who were entertainers in Taiwan. His father, Tao Dawei (David Tao Sr.) (September 28, 1942 – September 12, 2012), was an actor/singer/composer/TV Host and his mother, Wang Furong (Catherine), a Chinese opera singer.

Tao spent part of his childhood in Hong Kong (something which he shared with his audience during his Soul Power concerts in Hong Kong). His parents supposedly eloped when his father could not get approval to marry his mother. Tao had his education in Taiwan from kindergarten to the junior high school level at the Bethany Campus of Morrison Academy in Taipei. Later, his father decided to pursue his dream of working for Walt Disney, and they moved to Arcadia, California. There he attended Arcadia High School while David Tao Sr. realized his dream of working as an animator in Disney Burbank.

Tao's parents later returned to Taiwan where his father began his singing career, leaving him to complete his education in the United States. Left to fend for himself, Tao took on many jobs, including a stint as a civilian employee at the Los Angeles Police Department, without the knowledge of his parents. He attended the University of California, Irvine first. He graduated with a Bachelor of Arts in psychology from the University of California, Los Angeles.

Career
Whilst working as a salesman, Tao was offered a job by Taiwanese producer Wang Chih-ping and went back to Taiwan, initially writing, and later producing songs for many singers before releasing his self-titled album David Tao in 1997. He has since released four more albums, a live concert recording and a compilation of his best songs. Tao is a prolific composer and songwriter and has written songs for fellow artists such as A-Mei and S.H.E

David Tao (1997)
In 1997, with the help of Wang and another Taiwanese producer, Jim Lee, Tao released his self-titled first album (David Tao), under an independent label called Shock Records, set up by Taiwanese pop singer Jin Ruei-yao, and her husband. This album set a record in Taiwan during the 9th Golden Melody Awards as the first album from a new singer ever to be nominated for a total of five awards—Best Newcomer, Best Singer, Best Producer, Best Song and Best Album.

The song Airport 10.30 first caught people's attention, but it was the simply arranged, melodic I Love You that became one of Tao's signature tunes. The album also featured an a cappella song, Spring Wind, which was a new R&B version of a favorite old Taiwanese song. Tao sang all the vocals in this song, which still stands today, widely regarded as one of the best a cappella songs in Chinese.

Airport 10.30 was also nominated for the MTV Awards for Best Chinese Video in 1998 along with Coco Lee, who became the eventual winner.

Tao won two of the awards, namely Best Newcomer and Best Producer, becoming the first newcomer/singer to also win a Best Producer award. Tao's first album was notable for the excellent production which, remarkably, was done in Tao's home in Los Angeles entirely. The album also broke new ground in the music style and arrangement with its strong Western-influenced R&B flavor.

Tao shot to an unprecedented meteoric rise to fame following the release of David Tao. Unable to cope with the sudden media attention, he flew back to Los Angeles soon afterwards.

Between David Tao and his next album, besides releasing a remixed Bastard Pop ep, writing and producing songs for various hit Taiwanese singers, notably a theme song which became one of Taiwanese boyband Tension's hit songs, I'll Be With You, Tao was not heard on the Mandarin-Pop scene for a long while as he quietly disappeared into obscurity.

I'm OK (1999) 
In 1999, two years after his first album, Tao released his second album I'm OK. This album was claimed to be a best-selling album by breaking the previous record by selling 600,000 copies, yet various critics had claimed that the impact of I'm OK was not any stronger than his previous work in terms of style and arrangement.

Notable hits include:
 Rock ballad Rain, Angeline
 Country-flavored Small Town Girl
 R&B-influenced Just a Friend
 Leave, a soul number.
 Close to You, a love ballad.
 Tuberose, a catchy a cappella remake of a traditional Chinese song.

In this album, Tao attempted many musical styles, including, unsurprisingly, his favorite rock music. In fact, some critics have noted that each of his songs are different from one another, in terms of their style and music arrangement.

Tao was nominated for six GMA awards for I'm OK – Best Album, Best Producer, Best Singer, Best Video, Best Song and Best Song Arrangement. He only won the Best Producer Award on the GMA, but Rain later went on to win Best Chinese Video at the 2000 MTV Music Awards.

Black Tangerine (2002)
In 2002, Tao released "Black Tangerine". Some notable songs in this post-911 album, of which he derived much of his inspiration from:

 Black Tangerine, a hard-hitting rock song.
 Moon Over My Heart, an updated old Mandarin hit re-rendered in R&B style.
 My Anata, a Japanese-influenced rock number.
 Angel, a love ballad.
 22, a catchy tune depicting the woes of a girl in crossroads.
 Butterfly, an under-rated song which he penned about his relationship with God.
 Katrina, a surprise demo he wrote and sang entirely in English.
 Dear God, a song he wrote for 911.
 Melody, a song for a most important woman in his life.

What set Black Tangerine apart was the strong social commentary, including a track consisting of various actual Taiwanese news snippets of unrelated family tragedies and public incidents, placing the state of Taiwanese society in a somewhat negative point of view.

Dear God tells about the sadness of Tao regarding a mother of a victim who has died in 911 and stared at her son's picture and expected him to revive. Tao uses his song as weapon to bitterly criticize terrorists. Also, this song expressed Tao's voice that love was gradually neglected by this society; more and more people concern about money and drama more than love and equality today. Melody was written for his ex-girlfriend. Tao has described his feelings towards Melody through a monologue in his music video, "When you saw someone that gave you the same feeling of your first love in your sixteens, you gonna know that she is the right one". This song was one of the two songs he actually admitted to be dedicated to his ex-girlfriends.

Black Tangerine won various awards in Asia but was, incidentally, overlooked for the Golden Melody Awards in Taiwan, where the album was originally intended for.

Tao has since held a series of successful concerts in Hong Kong, Taiwan, Malaysia and Singapore in 2003, having already won many fans over with his signature simplistic style.

The Great Leap (2005) 
In 2005, Tao released his fourth album, The Great Leap. It earned four nominations at 17th Golden Melody Awards and won the "Best Album Award".
Notable songs in the album include:
 Ghost (鬼), the first single of the album, showcasing an eclectic mix of 80's Disco synth with Linkin Park-esque Metal & Rap elements. The lyrical style, a continuation of the social commentary from the previous album, describes a person's fears among a mass media-driven society that is getting too close for comfort.
 Susan Said (Susan 說), a track that combines Beijing Opera's unique singing accent and instrumental arrangement with Tao's signature R&B style.
 Love Can (就是愛你), An infectious sing-along ballad about love. A throwback to his signature tune, "I Love You" from his debut album.
 Who Do You Love (愛我還是他), The first ballad single off the album which had tremendous commercial appeal.
 Art of War (孫子兵法), nominated for Best Arrangement in 2006's Taiwan 17th Golden Melody Awards, this rock hit featured the "12 Girls Band" (女子十二樂坊) as Tao and co-arranger, Goh Kheng Long fused hard metal and traditional Chinese instruments into a song leaden with socially critical lyrics.

Beautiful (2006)
A fifth studio album by Tao was released on August 4, 2006. "Beautiful" was a successful album which had three nominations in GMA, being nominated with Best Song, Best Composer and Best Male Vocalist. Despite Tao being a GMA veteran, he never won Best vocalist and this time this was also no exception with Tao only winning Best Song with his Marry Me Today. Among the more popular songs in the album are the title song Too beautiful, another old song restyled into Tao's signature arrangement, Can't Get You Outta My Mind, and a duet song with Jolin Tsai, Marry Me Today.

Opus 69 (2009)
Tao's sixth album was released on August 21, 2009. It marks the return of Tao, and he developed the album with a blend of R&B, Rock and Soft Ballads.

Hello Goodbye (2013)
Four years after Opus 69, David Tao finally returns with the new album Hello Goodbye. The album was released on June 11, 2013. In this album, he integrated musical elements of yesterday – like classical guitar, synthesizer and harmonica – into contemporary melodies and arrangements. David teamed up with fellow singer-songwriters Tanya Chua and Crowd Lu as well as Sharon Kwan on multiple songs. Other than working with longtime collaborators waa and Ge Da Wei, he also invited Lin Xi, Huang Ting and Wu Hsiung to pen lyrics for the album.

Personal life
Tao speaks in fluent Mandarin and English.

Tao married Penny Chiang on August 31, 2014. It was revealed in 2015 that Tao had engaged in an extramarital affair with artist manager Ada Yang Zi Qing, whom he had first met at a post-concert celebratory dinner in late 2010, which continued even after his 2014 marriage with Chiang. When the website Quan Min Xing Tan published an interview with Yang which revealed their affair though WeChat chat screenshots in June 2015, Tao denied the cheating and threatened to file charges against Yang and the publishing website for the "malicious lies." However, Yang responded with a vow to release more evidence of her affair with Tao, and challenged him to file the charges, saying she too could afford to hire a lawyer.

On July 7, 2015, Tao held a 40-minute press conference with his agent and lawyer, where he admitted that he was cheating on his wife with Yang. "Penny, Father-in-law, Mother-in-law, please forgive me. Mum, I let you down. But thank you for not leaving me and for loving me... I made a mistake, I am very sorry and I’m very ashamed of what I did," Tao said, thanking his friends and fans for their continued support.

On February 14, 2019, Tao and Penny Chiang had their first son who is nicknamed "Bonbon".

Discography

Awards

References

External links
 
  

1969 births
Living people
Los Angeles Police Department officers
Singers from California
People from Arcadia, California
Hong Kong emigrants to Taiwan
Taiwanese Christians
Taiwanese Protestants
Taiwanese emigrants to the United States
Taiwanese male singers
Taiwanese Mandopop singer-songwriters
University of California, Los Angeles alumni
Taiwanese idols